The women's marathon 10 kilometres competition of the swimming events at the 2015 Pan American Games took place on July 12 at the Ontario Place West Channel, where athletes completed six 1.67 km laps. The defending Pan American Games champion was Cecilia Biagioli of Argentina.

Schedule
All times are Eastern Standard Time (UTC-3).

Results

References

External links
Schedule

Swimming at the 2015 Pan American Games
Pan American Games
2015 in women's swimming